Bandial is a village in the commune of Enampore, Nyassia Arrondissement, Ziguinchor Department in the Ziguinchor Region of Senegal. According to PEPAM (Programme d'eau potable et d'assainissement du Millénaire), Bandial has a population of 229 people living in 32 houses.

References
 Bandial at PEPAM

Populated places in the Ziguinchor Department